Chenari Assembly constituency is one of 243 constituencies of legislative assembly of Bihar. It comes under Sasaram Lok Sabha constituency.

Overview
Chenari comprises community blocks of Nauhatta, Rohtas & Chenari; Gram Panchayats Alampur, Raipurchor, Karup, Konki, Kumahu, Mohammadpur, Nad, Sikraur, Sheosagar, Sonahar & Uloh of Sheosagar CD Block.

Members of Legislative Assembly 

^ denotes By-elections

Election results

2020

See also
 List of constituencies of Bihar Legislative Assembly

References

External links
 

Politics of Rohtas district
Assembly constituencies of Bihar